The  (F.A.C.T.) is a 100 km Long-distance trail at the Northern part of  Lake Baikal in Siberia (Russia).

The trail was built by Russians and Germans in 2009 to encourage local tourism with concepts for the sustainable development of the region. 

The Trail should be used by experienced hikers only.

External links 

 Trail description on a Website of Baikalplan e.V.
 http://www.greatbaikaltrail.org/

Geography of Buryatia
Hiking trails in Siberia
Tourist attractions in Buryatia